The 1958 Critérium du Dauphiné Libéré was the 12th edition of the Critérium du Dauphiné Libéré cycle race and was held from 2 June to 8 June 1958. The race started and finished in Grenoble. The race was won by Louis Rostollan.

General classification

References

1958
1958 in French sport
June 1958 sports events in Europe